Loyola University Chicago (Loyola or LUC) is a private Jesuit research university in Chicago, Illinois. Founded in 1870 by the Society of Jesus, Loyola is one of the largest Catholic universities in the United States. Its namesake is Saint Ignatius of Loyola. Loyola's professional schools include programs in medicine, nursing, and health sciences anchored by the Loyola University Medical Center. It is classified among "R2: Doctoral Universities – High research activity".

Comprising thirteen colleges and schools, Loyola offers more than 80 undergraduate and 140 graduate/professional programs and enrolls approximately 17,000 students. Loyola has six campuses across the Chicago metropolitan area, as well as a campus in Rome and guest programs in Beijing and Ho Chi Minh City. The flagship Lake Shore Campus is on the shores of Lake Michigan in the Rogers Park and Edgewater neighborhoods of Chicago, just over seven miles north of the Loop.

Loyola's athletic teams, nicknamed the Ramblers, compete in NCAA Division I as members of the Atlantic 10 Conference. Loyola won the 1963 NCAA men's basketball championship and remains the only school from Illinois to do so. The Ramblers are also two-time (2014, 2015) NCAA champions in men's volleyball.

Among the more than 150,000 Loyola alumni are executives of major Chicago-based corporations such as McDonald's and Baxter International, as well as dozens of local and national political leaders, including the longtime former Speaker of the Illinois House of Representatives, Michael Madigan. Loyola alumni have won Emmy, Grammy, Peabody, and Pulitzer awards, as well as Guggenheim and MacArthur fellowships.

History 

On June 30, 1870, Jesuit priest and educator Arnold Damen established St. Ignatius College. At that time, Chicago was a much smaller, but rapidly growing city just shy of 300,000 people, and as a result, the original campus was much closer to the city center, along Roosevelt Road. In 1909, the school was renamed Loyola University, and in 1912, it began to move to the Lake Shore Campus; today the original building is part of St. Ignatius College Prep, adjacent to the University of Illinois at Chicago.

To meet the growing needs of Chicago, Loyola established professional schools in law (1908), medicine (1909), business (1922), and nursing (1935). The Chicago College of Dental Surgery became part of the university in 1923, and closed 70 years later. A downtown campus was founded in 1914, and with it, the School of Sociology. As the predecessor to the School of Social Work, it enrolled Loyola's first female students, though the school did not become fully coeducational until 1966. Loyola Academy, a college prep high school, occupied Dumbach Hall on the Lake Shore Campus, until it moved to Wilmette in 1957.

The current Water Tower Campus opened in 1949. In 1962, Loyola opened a campus in Rome, near the site of the 1960 Summer Olympics. In 1969, Loyola established the School of Education and consolidated medical programs at the Loyola University Medical Center, a hospital and health care complex in Maywood, a neighboring suburb of Chicago. The university legally separated from the Jesuits in 1970, and today is under lay control and governed by a board of trustees.  Loyola purchased neighboring Mundelein College in 1991.

Major capital campaigns, since the turn of the century, have greatly enhanced Loyola's academic profile and campuses. In 2005, the Loyola University Museum of Art was established on the Water Tower Campus, and the Rome campus was renamed in honor of Director Emeritus John P. Felice. In 2009, the Cuneo Foundation presented the university with the Cuneo Mansion and Gardens, a 100-acre estate with an Italianate mansion and extensive collections of art and furnishings in Vernon Hills. The $50 million gift is the largest in Loyola history.

In 2010, Loyola purchased the Resurrection Retreat Center in Woodstock for retreats and ecological study, allowing the site to become the school's fifth campus. In 2012, Loyola alumnus Michael R. Quinlan donated $40 million to the business school, which was renamed in his honor. During this time, over 200,000 square feet of LEED-certified sustainable spaces have been built on the Lake Shore Campus , along with significant mixed-use developments on the Water Tower Campus.

Loyola ranks among the top 104 universities in the nation, and is currently undergoing over $800 million in capital construction projects. In 2015, the university established Arrupe College, a uniquely structured two-year college designed to give low-income students access to a Loyola education.

On May 23, 2016, Loyola named Jo Ann Rooney its 24th president. She is the school's first female president.

Campuses

Lake Shore Campus 

Loyola's flagship Lake Shore Campus is on the shores of Lake Michigan in the Rogers Park and Edgewater neighborhoods on Chicago's north side, about seven and a half miles north of the Loop. Founded in 1912, it is the school's primary residential campus and the home of the College of Arts and Sciences and a variety of graduate programs. With over 40 buildings, the campus offers green space and lakeshore access, as well as several landmarks:
The Madonna della Strada Chapel, an Art Deco masterpiece completed in 1939, is the center of Loyola's religious life. The Mundelein Center, a 200-foot tall Art Deco skyscraper completed in 1930, is the home of Loyola's fine and performing arts programs and a National Historical Landmark. The Joseph J. Gentile Arena, which holds 5,500 for basketball, volleyball, and campus events, was recently expanded to include the Norville Center, a student-athlete academic center and home of Rambler athletics. One of the largest events held annually in Gentile Arena is Colossus, which features a musical artist and comedian. Artists, including Jason Derulo and John Mulaney, have performed for Colossus. The Halas Recreation Center was remodeled and incorporated into the sprawling new Damen Student Center, the heart of campus social life. 

The E.M. Cudahy Memorial Library contains over 900,000 volumes and 3,600 periodical subscriptions, and in 2008, was expanded to include the Information Commons, an academic and social space with glass curtain walls that offer unparalleled views of the lake and campus. Science education and research takes place in the Quinlan Life Sciences building and the Institute of Environmental Sustainability, a multipurpose complex that includes academic space, a residence hall, a greenhouse, and the largest geothermal energy facility in Chicago.

The Lake Shore Campus is connected to the Chicago "L" via the Loyola station on the CTA Red Line. Red Line trains pass north-bound to the Howard terminus and south-bound to the Loop and South Side. Purple Line trains pass by the Loyola CTA station, but do not stop.

Sustainability 
Loyola's various environmental efforts have reduced university energy use by 33% since 1998. Loyola has three LEED Silver certified buildings and four LEED Gold certified buildings, with all future construction to be LEED certified as well. Loyola has more green roofs than any college in the Midwest, which includes both new and renovated buildings. In 2014, Loyola placed 4th nationally (and 1st in Illinois) in the Sierra Club's ranking of America's Greenest Colleges.

Water Tower Campus 
The Water Tower Campus opened in 1949, along a stretch of Michigan Avenue today known as the Magnificent Mile, and is named after the Chicago Water Tower, a city landmark that survived the Great Chicago Fire of 1871. It is the home of the Quinlan School of Business, the School of Law, the School of Education, the School of Continuing and Professional Studies, the School of Social Work, the School of Communication, the Institute of Pastoral Studies, and Arrupe College, as well as a selection of classes from programs based elsewhere.

Dominated by mixed-use skyscrapers, campus buildings include the Corboy Law Center, Terry Student Center, Baumhart Hall, and landmark Lewis Towers, built in 1945 as the Illinois Catholic Women's Club, and today home of the Office of the President and the Loyola University Museum of Art. Recent construction includes the School of Communication which occupies the basement, first, and second floors of The Clare, a 587-foot tower that serves as a retirement community, and the LEED-certified John and Kathy Schreiber Center, which opened in 2015 as the new home of the Quinlan School of Business.

The campus is steps from the offices of major corporations, Chicago's premiere retail and tourist district, as well as institutions like the Museum of Contemporary Art and the Newberry Library. Holy Name Cathedral, the seat of the Archdiocese of Chicago, is directly adjacent to the south.

The Water Tower Campus is also connected to the 'L' via the Chicago station on the CTA Red Line. Students can travel between Water Tower Campus and Lakeshore Campus on a school-sponsored shuttle during the week.

Health Sciences Campus 
Founded in 1969, along with the Loyola University Medical Center, the Health Sciences Campus in Maywood is the home of the Stritch School of Medicine, the Marcella Niehoff School of Nursing, and several programs that are part of the School of Continuing and Professional Studies. Maywood is a nearby western suburb of Chicago, approximately eleven miles from the Loop.

Loyola University Medical Center comprises the main hospital, Loyola Outpatient Center, Ronald McDonald Children's Hospital, Cardinal Bernardin Cancer Center, and several medical office and laboratory buildings. In 2011, the medical center was sold to Trinity Health, while Loyola continues to own and operate the academic buildings and select research facilities on campus.

In 2017, Loyola expanded its accelerated nursing program to an online-based format with lab in Downers Grove.

John Felice Rome Center 
Loyola's permanent campus in Rome opened in 1962 at Casa Italiana Viaggi Internazionali Studenti (C.I.V.I.S.), a dormitory originally built to host athletes during the 1960 Summer Olympics. In 1978, the campus moved to its current location on Monte Mario, approximately two miles northwest of Vatican City. The campus is the home of the oldest American university program in Italy, and hosts students from both Loyola and other universities seeking to study abroad. In 2005, the campus was renamed in honor of founder and Director Emeritus John P. Felice.

Additional campuses 
In 2010, Loyola founded the Retreat and Ecology Campus on the former site of the Resurrection Retreat Center in Woodstock, Illinois, an outer suburb approximately fifty miles northwest of Chicago. The campus houses the university's campus ministry programs, and offers a unique learning opportunity for students and faculty interested in the sciences. The property contains  of natural habitat that includes ponds, streams, woods, and prairie.

Loyola also owns and operates the Cuneo Mansion and Gardens in suburban Vernon Hills, Illinois, approximately thirty miles north of Chicago. The mansion and grounds were donated to the university in 2009, by the John and Herta Cuneo Foundation. The estate operates as a museum and hosts special events and a growing number of academic programs in business, education and law.

Academics

Tuition 
For the 2016–2017 academic year, undergraduate tuition for new full-time students was $42,720 per year, not including room, board and fees, including the CTA student transit 'U-Pass', Student Activity Fee, Technology Fee and mandatory health insurance. Graduate school tuition varies, depending on the school.

Rankings and demographics 
Loyola University Chicago is ranked 104th among National Universities, according to the 2019  U.S. News & World Report college rankings. U.S. News commonly places Loyola among their "Best Value" and their "A-plus Schools for B Students" lists as well. In 2011, USA Today ranked Loyola 6th among "colleges most committed to community service." Washington Monthly ranked Loyola 21st in the nation for hours of community service.

Loyola's Graduate School of Business has been ranked #1 in Ethics nationwide by BusinessWeek. In 2006, Loyola's History Department ranked sixth in the nation on the Faculty Scholarly Productivity Index, a respected ranking system of graduate faculty quality. In 2010, the History Department also ranked in the top tier in the 2010 National Research Council's evaluation of the nation's graduate programs.

Religious education 
Loyola's Department of Theology offers undergraduate and graduate courses in the study of systematic theology, ethics, and Biblical studies, offering a diverse set of classes that are not limited to religious studies in a Catholic context.

Loyola hosts a Jesuit First Studies Program, one of three in the country, with Fordham University and Saint Louis University housing the other two. During a three-year period in the program, Jesuit Scholastics and Brothers generally study philosophy and some theology. First Studies is one part of an eleven-year formation process toward the Jesuit priesthood. This program is administered by the Midwest Province of the Society of Jesus.

Until 2019, Loyola also hosted Saint Joseph College Seminary, which served the Catholic Archdiocese of Chicago and provided vocational training to candidates for the diocesan priesthood. Loyola University also provided religious education for those seeking careers in lay ministry with the Loyola University Institute of Pastoral Studies, as well as degree opportunities in interdisciplinary Catholic studies.

Schools and colleges 
Loyola Chicago is composed of the following schools and colleges:
 College of Arts & Sciences
 Quinlan School of Business
 School of Communication
 School of Continuing and Professional Studies
 School of Education
 The Graduate School
 School of Law
 Stritch School of Medicine
 Marcella Niehoff School of Nursing
 School of Social Work
 Arrupe College
 Parkinson School of Health Sciences and Public Health 
 School of Environmental Sustainability

Student life

Residential life 
Most of the residence halls and apartments managed by Loyola's Department of Residence Life are in the Rogers Park and Edgewater neighborhoods, surrounding the Lake Shore Campus. One, Baumhart Hall, is at the Water Tower Campus on the Magnificent Mile in Chicago. Most of Loyola's residence halls are named after other Jesuit colleges and universities.

First-year students may live in one of the following residences on the Lake Shore campus: Campion Hall, Francis Hall (for first year students of the Interdisciplinary Honors Program), de Nobili Hall, Mertz Hall, Regis Hall, San Francisco Hall, and the Simpson Living Learning Center (Simpson Hall). Simpson, Mertz, and de Nobili Halls are located above dining halls that serve these buildings and the halls surrounding them. Residence halls on the north side of campus are served by a dining hall and food court in the Damen Student Center. First- and second-year students are required to live in on-campus housing.

Third- and fourth-year students are permitted to choose from fifteen residences at the Lake Shore campus: Bellarmine, Canisius, Fairfield, Fordham, Georgetown, LeMoyne, Marquette, Marquette South, Messina, Regis, Saint Louis, Santa Clara, Seattle, Spring Hill and Xavier Halls. Santa Clara Hall is on Loyola Avenue, with views of Lake Michigan. Upperclassmen can also choose to live in Baumhart Hall, located at 26 E. Pearson, just a block from the Magnificent Mile in downtown Chicago. It is a 25-floor apartment-style residence for upperclassmen and graduate students at Loyola University. Students living in Baumhart and taking classes on the Water Tower Campus have access to two dining facilities: Nina's Cafe (in the Corboy Law Center) and LU's Old-Fashioned Deli and Pub (in the Terry Student Center).

Greek life 
Loyola University Chicago is home to several Greek letter organizations. Among them are traditional social fraternities and sororities, professional co-ed fraternities, and cultural interest fraternities and sororities.

Inter-Fraternity Council chapters include Beta Theta Pi, Tau Kappa Epsilon, Sigma Chi, Delta Sigma Phi, and Pi Kappa Phi.

Panhellenic Council chapters include Alpha Chi Omega, Alpha Sigma Alpha, Phi Sigma Sigma, Kappa Kappa Gamma, Chi Omega, Alpha Delta Pi, and Kappa Delta.

Professional co-ed fraternities include Delta Sigma Pi, Phi Delta Epsilon, as well as service fraternity Alpha Phi Omega.

Cultural interest fraternities include the National Association of Latino Fraternal Organizations (NALFO) co-ed fraternity Alpha Psi Lambda. Loyola is also home to the Latino Lambda Upsilon Lambda fraternity, and the African-American fraternities Alpha Phi Alpha, Kappa Alpha Psi, and Phi Beta Sigma.
Cultural interest sororities include Gamma Phi Omega, Sigma Lambda Gamma, Lambda Theta Alpha, Delta Phi Lambda, Delta Sigma Theta and Alpha Kappa Alpha.

College radio station 
Loyola University owned and operated a low-power, carrier current radio station, WLUC-AM, in the 1960s. Students broadcast an eclectic music format on 600 kHz to Lake Shore Campus buildings and the surrounding Rogers Park neighborhood. The station had a well-equipped studio in a University-owned Student Life house on Loyola Avenue. The structure was demolished to make way for the Crown Center for the Humanities.

WLUC-AM was replaced by an on-air FM station, WLUW, in the 1970s.

Athletics 

NCAA Division I National Championships (3):
1963 Men's Basketball, 2014 Men's Volleyball, 2015 Men's Volleyball

Loyola is home to 11 varsity teams, most of which compete in NCAA Division I. The teams include men and women's basketball, cross country, men and women's golf, men and women's soccer, softball, track, and men and women's volleyball. The nickname "Ramblers" was first applied to Loyola's football team in 1926, because they frequently traveled throughout the United States.

The LU Wolf is the mascot for the University. He was inspired by the coat-of-arms of St. Ignatius of Loyola, from whom Loyola derives its name, which depicts two wolves standing over a kettle. Taken from the heraldic crest carved in the lintel on St. Ignatius' family home in Azpeitia, Spain, the wolves and cauldron refer to the prosperity and generosity of the Loyola family, who, after feeding family, retainers and soldiers, had enough food to feed even the wild animals.

Loyola's men's basketball team, the Ramblers, won the 1963 national championship. Loyola is the only Division I NCAA school in Illinois to have won a national title in men's basketball. In 2018, they finished the NCAA tournament with the all-time highest win percentage of any team to have ever competed in the tournament. Loyola placed slightly ahead of Duke University.

The Loyola Ramblers men's volleyball team won back-to-back NCAA championships in 2014 and 2015.

In 2018, Loyola's men's basketball team won the Missouri Valley Conference tournament championship to qualify for the 2018 NCAA Division I men's basketball tournament, for the first time since 1985. The 11-seed Ramblers recorded four straight upset victories against the Miami Hurricanes, Tennessee Volunteers, Nevada Wolf Pack, and Kansas State Wildcats to advance to the Final Four. However, the Michigan Wolverines defeated Loyola in the Final Four.

The publicity surrounding Loyola's tournament run generated an estimated $300 million in publicity for the school.

In October 2018, the Loyola Ramblers Women's Soccer team won the Missouri Valley Conference regular season title with 6–1 win over Evansville. The win gave the Ramblers their first Missouri Valley Conference regular season title in program history.

In November 2021 Loyola announced that it would be joining the Atlantic 10 conference in 2022.

Notable alumni 

 Leslie David Baker, actor (The Office)
 Ian Brennan, co-creator and writer (Glee, Scream Queens, The Politician)
 Susan Candiotti, CNN correspondent
 Shams Charania - reporter for The Athletic
 William M. Daley, President Obama's White House Chief of Staff and former United States Secretary of Commerce under President Bill Clinton
 Timothy J. Danis - businessman, founder of RCP Advisors
David Draiman, lead singer of the band Disturbed
Norman Geisler, president of Southern Evangelical Seminary in Charlotte, North Carolina
Lori Greiner,  inventor, investor, entrepreneur, and television personality
Joseph C. Grendys, Owner of Koch Foods
 George Halas, Jr., former president/owner of the Chicago Bears
 Neil F. Hartigan, former Illinois Attorney General, candidate for Governor, former Lt. Governor 
 Donte Ingram, NBA player for the Dallas Mavericks
 Bruce Lerman, cardiologist; Chief of the Division of Cardiology and Director of the Cardiac Electrophysiology Laboratory at Weill Cornell Medicine and the New York Presbyterian Hospital
 Marsha M. Linehan, Founder of Dialectical Behavior Therapy
 Lisa Madigan, Illinois Attorney General
 Michael Madigan, former Speaker of the Illinois House of Representatives and former chairman of the Democratic Party of Illinois
 Stanley Miarka, Negro league baseball second baseman (1950)
 Jennifer Morrison, actress (Once Upon a Time, House)
 Bob Newhart, Peabody Award-winning actor and comedian, The Bob Newhart Show and Newhart
 Michael R. Quinlan, McDonald's Corporation Chairman
 Todd Ricketts, co-owner of Chicago Cubs
 Thomas Schoewe, CFO of Wal-Mart Stores, Inc.
William Scholl, founder of Dr. Scholl's footcare
 Robert R. Thomas, current Chief Justice of the Supreme Court of Illinois
 Phil Weintraub, Major League Baseball player (1933–38, 44–45)
 John York, co-owner of the San Francisco 49ers

See also
 List of Jesuit sites

References

External links 

 

 
Jesuit universities and colleges in the United States
North Side, Chicago
Association of Catholic Colleges and Universities
Buildings with sculpture by Corrado Parducci
Educational institutions established in 1870
Midwestern Intercollegiate Volleyball Association
Catholic universities and colleges in Illinois
1870 establishments in Illinois